Seerapalli is a panchayat town in Namakkal district in the Indian state of Tamil Nadu.

Geography
Seerapalli Lake

Demographics

Population 
 India census, Seerapalli had a population of 11,778. Males constitute 51% of the population and females 49%. Seerapalli has an average literacy rate of 63%, higher than the national average of 59.5%: male literacy is 71%, and female literacy is 54%. In Seerapalli, 9% of the population is under 6 years of age.

Transport

By Air  
Salem 30 km

By Rail  
Rasipuram 7 km

By Road  
Buses from Attur to Rasipuram stops at Seerapalli

Education 
govt Middle School

References

Cities and towns in Namakkal district